Cornbread is a generic name for any number of quick breads (a bread leavened chemically, rather than by yeast) containing cornmeal.

It may also refer to:
 Cornbread (album), an album by jazz musician Lee Morgan
 Cedric Maxwell (born 1955), retired National Basketball Association player nicknamed "Cornbread"
 Cornbread Harris (born 1927), American musician
 Hal Singer (1919–2020), American R&B and jazz bandleader and saxophonist
 Cornbread (graffiti artist) (born 1953), American graffitist

See also
 Cornbread Red, American pool player Billy Joe Burge (1931–2004)
 Kornbread Jeté, American drag queen

Lists of people by nickname